The H.R. Neitzel House in Boise, Idaho, is a -story Tudor Revival house designed by Tourtellotte & Hummel and constructed of sandstone by contractor Frank Michel in 1918. The house features a hip roof with half-timber gables.

Herman R. Neitzel was an investor in Boise, and he owned the Bannock Motor Sales Company, an automobile dealership and successor to the Central Auto Company, purveyors of Maxwell cars and Garford trucks. He lived at the H.R. Neitzel House from its construction until his death in 1963.

References

National Register of Historic Places in Boise, Idaho
Houses in Boise, Idaho
Tudor Revival architecture in Idaho
Houses completed in 1918
Tourtellotte & Hummel buildings
1918 establishments in Idaho